Little Bangladesh may refer to:
 Little Bangladesh, Los Angeles
 Banglatown, Detroit
 Brick Lane, London, also known as Banglatown

See also
 Curry Row in Manhattan, a group of South Asian restaurants operated by Bangladeshis
 Lakemba, a suburb of Sydney, Australia whose current population is 12%  Bengali